Matthew Keith Hall (born 1 October 1964), known professionally as Harry Hill, is an English comedian, presenter and writer. He pursued a career in stand-up following years working as a medical doctor, developing an off-beat, energetic performance style that fused elements of surrealism, observational comedy, slapstick, satire and music. When performing, he usually wears browline glasses and a dress shirt with a distinctive oversized collar and cuffs.

He won the Perrier Award for Best Newcomer at the 1992 Edinburgh Festival Fringe, and began his career in radio and television comedy with the radio series Harry Hill's Fruit Corner (1993–1997). He has hosted his own television comedy show Harry Hill's TV Burp (2001–2012), and narrated You've Been Framed! from 2004-2022. His other projects include The Harry Hill Movie, released in 2013.

Early life, education and medical career
Hill was born as Matthew Keith Hall in Woking, Surrey, on 1 October 1964 and grew up in Staplehurst, Kent, where he attended the local primary school. At the age of 14, Hill moved with his family to Hong Kong for two years and attended Island School there. He was later educated at Angley School and then Cranbrook School in Kent and St George's Hospital Medical School. He received his MBBS medical degree from the University of London in 1988. Hill worked as a house officer at Doncaster Royal Infirmary, before quitting the medical profession because he "didn't feel in control of what was happening"; he is still registered on the General Medical Council's list of Registered Medical Practitioners.

Career

Harry Hill's Fruit Corner (1993–1997)

Hill achieved his breakthrough in 1992, when he won the Perrier Award for Best Newcomer at the Edinburgh Festival Fringe. Shortly after, a radio show starring Hill was commissioned by BBC Radio 4 entitled Harry Hill's Fruit Corner. Hill hosted the show as himself, and each week, he was joined by various guest performers, as well as regular character actors including Al Murray and Burt Kwouk. The show featured a variety of other celebrity guests during its run including Rolf Harris and Ronnie Corbett. Each episode is interspersed with Hill's stand up routines. Fruit Corner ran for four series on BBC Radio 4.

Harry Hill's Fruit Fancies (1994)
Hill made his television breakthrough in 1994, when he starred in BBC Two black-and-white silent-comedy series Harry Hill's Fruit Fancies. In a similar format to Fruit Corner, Hill performed a series of sketches, with celebrity guests making cameo appearances.

The series ran for six episodes on BBC Two between October and December 1994. For Christmas that year, a VHS containing a 100-minute compilation of the best material from the series, as well as unseen sketches, was released by BBC Video.

Saturday Live (1996)
Hill was a regular on Saturday Live, which was broadcast in 1996 on ITV for eight episodes.

Harry Hill (1997–2000)

Harry Hill got his own television series on Channel 4 in 1997. Among the regular characters were Harry Hill's big brother, Alan, played by Al Murray, and his adopted son, Alan Jr., played by Matt Bradstock. Burt Kwouk also appeared in many episodes as Harry's "Chicken Catcher" – and each week, he would come up with an excuse as to why he has not yet captured a chicken, followed by a performance of the song "Hey Little Hen". In later series, Hill and Kwouk appeared in sketches as Karl Lagerfeld and Gianni Versace.

Hill's screen wife Mai Sung also made several appearances on the show, mainly on the theme of trying to steal his Abbey National bank savings book. Another character that featured on the show was Stouffer the Cat, a glove puppet cat made from blue rubber. Stouffer would normally sit in a throne, supported by a rubber arm in the style of Rod Hull, and was employed to intimidate guests during Hill's standup routines. Some of Stouffer's catchphrases are "he got a big face" and "sorted – respect due".

At the end of each episode, an event called "The Badger Parade" was supposed to take place. The parade featured a number of puppet badgers that included "Gareth Southgate badger" and "Tasmin Archer badger", among others – however, every week, there would be some kind of problem, resulting in the badgers being unable to perform. In place of the badger parade, Hill would usually sing a song, with a guest that he had invited onto the show. A tie-in book relating to the series was released in October 1998, entitled Harry Hill's Fun Book.

The series was cancelled in April 2000, but was revived by ITV in March 2003, as The All-New Harry Hill Show. It was broadcast it along with episodes of TV Burp. Regular features on the ITV version included the Hamilton Challenge, featuring Neil and Christine Hamilton, and a butterfly in blue jeans. The Channel 4 series was revisited in August 2012, for a retrospective documentary entitled Whatever Happened to Harry Hill?.

Harry Hill's TV Burp (2001–2012)

In October 2001, Hill moved to ITV in a lucrative deal, in which he created an all new show, Harry Hill's TV Burp, where he would take a look at the week's television, showing clips from various British television programmes, and framing them with commentary or intercutting additional footage.

The series would feature a regular stable of all new characters, including the Knitted Character; a small knitted rabbit, Wagbo, a demon love child whose parents are reportedly Wagner Carillho and Mary Byrne of X Factor fame, an interpretation of Heather Trott from EastEnders, played by Steve Bernham, as well as a doll of The Apprentice star Alan Sugar, who would regularly rap before clips of The Apprentice were introduced.

The show was piloted in December 2001, before running for fifteen full series between 2002 and 2012, before being cancelled to allow Hill to work on other projects. Hill would occasionally say his catchphrase "Chippy chips!" and the show became known for another catchphrase "You get the idea with that." and Hill's actual sideways look at a topic, the show developed a cult following and was popular with the entire family. It is an industry rumour still that in the last few years of the show that some of the programs Hill would focus on - especially the soaps - would deliberately try to get featured on the show by giving prominence to bald members of teams (or experts) in all kinds of shows or obviously pushing for rhyming dialogue so as to get it in Poetry Corner. The show won a number of BAFTA awards, and spawned five Best of TV Burp DVD compilations, and a book based on the series, which was released for Christmas 2009.

You've Been Framed! (2004–2022)

From 2004 to 2022, Hill narrated 15 series of the comical clip show You've Been Framed!, often shortened to YBF!, replacing Jonathan Wilkes on the show. In February 2023, it was reported that the show had been axed by ITV.

Harry Hill's Shark Infested Custard (2005)

In October 2005, Hill wrote and starred in Harry Hill's Shark Infested Custard, a thirteen part show broadcast in the CITV children's television slot, on ITV. While many of his well known characters, such as Stouffer and Garry Hill, his fictional layabout son from his first marriage, remained, it also showcased several new characters, including Speed Camera Boy, an outsider who is half boy and half speed camera, and Evelynne Hussey, a one-woman band who played a number of different instruments.

While the show featured a game show element, Help the Aged, it was very similar in structure to Harry Hill. In the show, Hill wore a pale yellow, custard coloured shirt, with a giant collar, instead of his usual white collar.

The series was never released on DVD; however, it did spawn Harry Hill's Whopping Great Joke Book, a book of children's jokes, released in 2006. The book was also made available as an iPhone application. A second book, Harry Hill's Bumper Book of Bloopers, was released for Christmas 2011.

The Harry Hill Movie (2013)

The Harry Hill Movie premiered in the United Kingdom on 20 December 2013. The film also stars Matt Lucas, Julie Walters, Johnny Vegas, Sheridan Smith, Simon Bird, Marc Wootton, Jim Broadbent, and band The Magic Numbers.
The film sees Hill embark on a road trip to Blackpool with his Nan (Julie Walters) when he discovers that his hamster only has one week to live.

The 88 minute film was directed by Steve Bendelack. To date, it has made $3,647,870 at the box office. This was also released on DVD on 14 April 2014.

Stars in Their Eyes (2015)

Hill presented a revived version of the ITV talent show Stars in Their Eyes. The series aired for six episodes from 10 January until 14 February 2015. The revival has proved divisive. Fans of the original format were extremely critical of it, saying that Hill had made the show about himself rather than the contestants.

In April 2015, it was announced that the show had been axed by ITV, due to extremely poor ratings.

Harry Hill's Tea Time (2016–2018)
Tea Time saw Hill welcome guests to a spoof comedy kitchen and ask them to cook bizarre things. A new entertainment series for Sky 1, the first series debuted on 16 October 2016, and was viewed by 400,000 viewers. Ratings slipped the following week, when only 180,000 watched. Guests for the first series included Paul Hollywood, Joey Essex, Gok Wan, Martin Kemp and Jason Donovan.

Harry Hill's Tea Time was commissioned for a second series which began airing in January 2018.

Harry Hill's Alien Fun Capsule (2017–2019)
In March 2017, Hill began presenting 6x30minute episode of Harry Hill's Alien Fun Capsule, which aired on ITV on Thursday nights, 8.30 to 9 pm.

The panel show sees Harry welcoming two teams of two celebrity guests as they are tasked with saving planet Earth from alien invasion by sending evidence (via the "fun capsule" of the title) that Earthlings are good fun and therefore worthy of saving from destruction. Harry alludes to the premise of the show as being rather tenuous in a running joke during each show's introduction, before introducing the two teams of guests, usually a mix of comedians and television stars.

In a similar style to Harry Hill's TV Burp, the show includes various clips from television and film, often attributed or related somehow to the current guests. The guests also partake in sketches and songs based on or directly spoofing the funny or bizarre items featured. There is a regular slot entitled "Local News Round Up", accompanied by its own theme tune, which involves each of the guests taking turns to read out bizarre headlines from local newspapers. Alan the Alien also appears as a green extra terrestrial's arm, emerging from a box to aid Harry in some way.

The series has received positive reviews, with many pointing out the similarities to TV Burp.

The show moved to Saturday Evenings between 7.30 pm and 8.00 pm for a second series, aired in 2018, and a third in 2019.

Harry Hill's World of TV (2020)

In 2020, Harry Hill started presenting Harry Hill's World of TV. Using archive clips, this TV Burp-style show pokes fun at television, with each episode themed around a specific genre.

Novels
In 2002, Hill published a novel entitled Flight From Deathrow, based around the unlikely (fictional) antics of real-life celebrities and politicians, as seen through the eyes of a storyteller who drifts in and out of a coma. His second book, Tim the Tiny Horse, was published in October 2006, and featured the tale of a small horse who has to wear glasses because of poor eyesight.

Hill's third book, The Further Adventures of the Queen Mum, was published in October 2007, and was a comic take on the life and times of the Queen Mother. His fourth novel, Tim the Tiny Horse at Large, which is a sequel to Tim the Tiny Horse, was published in October 2009.

In 2010, Hill released Livin' the Dreem, a fictional account of a year in his life with frequent references to pop culture. The book was reprinted in May 2011, with additional entries for events occurring between January and April of that year.

A Complete History of Tim (the Tiny Horse) was published in November 2012 which contains the first two Tim the Tiny Horse novels, with four new stories.

Other projects
Hill has recorded voice-overs on television commercials. Advertisements that Hill has provided a voice over for include the holiday adverts for Boots in 2004, the "Bring on the Branston!" adverts for the Branston Pickle brand during 2006 to 2007, adverts for the Green Flag car breakdown service, and adverts for the new yogurt, Danio by Danone. He also sang in 2001 "This Charming Man" by The Smiths as Morrissey in Stars in their Eyes.

In February 2001, and again in April, Hill appeared on Lily Savage's Blankety Blank. Hill has also appeared as a guest on the BBC Radio 4 series I'm Sorry I Haven't a Clue, in the ChuckleVision episode "Mind Your Manors", the first episode of the twentieth series, and as Joon Boolay in the Sky Atlantic sitcom This is Jinsy. In October 2006, Hill presented his own episode of long running ITV series, An Audience With..., in which he revived several characters from Harry Hill. On 4 October 2004, he also appeared in an episode of Room 101.

In November 2010, Hill released his debut comic album, 'Funny Times'. The album was preceded by the singles 'I Wanna Baby', 'SuBo', and 'Ken!', which features William Roache, as his Coronation Street character, Ken Barlow, is the feature of the song. Since October 2010, Hill has had his own comic strip in The Dandy, entitled Harry Hill's Real Life Adventures in TV Land, drawn by Nigel Parkinson. Hill was directly involved in its creation and is co-credited with Parkinson. Between October and December 2010, Hill starred in a weekly online comedy series on the ChannelFlip website, entitled Harry Hill's Little Internet Show. Ten episodes of the show were broadcast online.

Awards
In 2003, The Observer listed Hill as one of the fifty funniest acts in British comedy. In 2005, in a poll to find The Comedian's Comedian, he was voted amongst the Top 50 comedy acts ever by fellow comedians and comedy insiders. In 2007, Hill was voted #5 on Channel 4's hundred greatest stand ups. On 13 December 2006, Hill won two Highland Spring British Comedy Awards, over the favourites Ant and Dec, which Hill made light of in his acceptance speeches.

In 2008, he won two BAFTAs, and another in 2009 for Best Entertainment Performance. In 2009, he won two British Comedy Awards, making it his sixth award. He also won again in 2011, but was unable to be there and sent Wagbo to collect it on his behalf. He was also nominated for 3 other awards, including the People's Choice Award, which was won by Miranda Hart.

Personal life
Hill married artist Magda Archer in 1996, in Wandsworth, London. They have three daughters: Kitty Clover, Winifred Millicent and Frederica Aster, all born in Kensington and Chelsea. Hill and his family live in Whitstable, Kent.

In February 2006, Hill was a victim of identity theft; a sum of £280,000 was stolen from his bank account.

In Autumn 2008, Hill launched Harry's Nuts, a brand of Fairtrade peanuts.

On 17 July 2014, Hill was awarded an honorary Doctorate of Arts by the University of Kent, in recognition of his contribution to television and the arts.

On 25 August 2016, Hill became a patron of Action Duchenne which funds research for Duchenne muscular dystrophy, and fights for improved standards of care.

Hill is a supporter of the Labour Party and canvassed for the party during the 2015 general election.

Filmography
Television

Radio

Musicals

Film

Home releases

Stand-up shows
 Live (16 October 1995) VHS
 Man Alive – Live (27 October 1997) VHS
 First Class Scamp – Live (16 November 1998) DVD/VHS
 Birdstrike! – Live (20 November 2000) VHS
 In Hooves – Live (21 November 2005) DVD
 Sausage Time – Live (7 February 2013) DVD

Television
 Fruit Fancies (11 December 1994) VHS
 Harry Hill's TV Burp Gold (10 November 2008, 61 minutes, Rating: 12) DVD
 Harry Hill's TV Burp Gold 2 (9 November 2009, 61 minutes, Rating: 12) DVD
 Harry Hill's TV Burp Gold 3 (1 November 2010, 64 minutes, Rating: PG) DVD
 Harry Hill's TV Burp: The Best Bits (14 November 2011, 60 minutes, Rating: 12) DVD
 Harry Hill's Cream Of TV Burp (26 November 2012, 63 minutes, Rating: PG) DVD

Film
 The Harry Hill Movie (14 April 2014, 88 minutes, Rating: PG) DVD & Blu-Ray Disc

Discography

Audiobooks
 Fruit Corner (2 October 1995)
 Hooves (20 March 2006)
 Man Alive (20 February 2007)
 Flight from Deathrow (2 April 2009)
 Livin' the Dreem (4 November 2010)

Music
 The First Meeting Of The International Recipe Card Top Trump Society (2008)
 Funny Times (29 November 2010)

Television advertisements

References

External links

 Official Site – Official Website
 Chortle Harry Hill on Chortle
 

 
1964 births
Living people
20th-century English comedians
20th-century English male actors
20th-century English medical doctors
20th-century English writers
21st-century English comedians
21st-century English male actors
21st-century English medical doctors
21st-century English writers
Alumni of St George's, University of London
Best Entertainment Performance BAFTA Award (television) winners
British expatriates in Hong Kong
British male television writers
English comedy writers
English male comedians
English male television actors
English radio personalities
English television personalities
English television writers
English victims of crime
Male actors from Kent
Male actors from Surrey
People educated at Cranbrook School, Kent
People educated at Island School
People from Staplehurst
People from Woking
The Dandy people
21st-century British medical doctors